Markiyeh (also Romanized as Markīyeh) is a village in Howmeh Rural District, in the Central District of Masal County, Gilan Province, Iran. At the 2006 census, its population was 739, in 190 families.

References 

Populated places in Masal County